This is a list of the shortest airport runways in the world. While most modern commercial aircraft require a paved runway of at least  in length, many early aircraft were designed to operate from unprepared strips that could be improvised in small spaces. Los Angeles's Grand Central Airport, considered a landmark in aviation history, had a  runway during its first six years of operation from 1923 to 1929. Such airstrips were used by heavy as well as light aircraft. During the Doolittle Raid in WW II, twin-engine B-25 bombers with a loaded weight of seventeen tons took off from the  flight deck of the carrier USS Hornet. Many small airfields capable of accommodating these types remain in use, mostly in remote areas in the American West and the French Alps, where space is limited.

See also 
 Altiport
 Aviation
 Density altitude
 List of longest runways
 STOLport

References 

Lists of airports
Technology-related lists